Robert P. "Rob" Bacon (born 1955) is a Republican politician and legislator from the state of Iowa. He was elected to the Iowa House of Representatives in 2012 to represent the 48th district. He was previously elected to the Iowa Senate in 2010 to represent District 5, which serves Wright, Hamilton, and Story Counties. Bacon was born in Chicago and his hometown is Maxwell, Iowa.

Current legislative committees 
Bacon has been a member of the following legislative committees:
 Economic Growth/Rebuild Iowa, Member
 Human Resources, Member
 Local Government, Member
 Subcommittee on Health and Human Services (Joint Appropriations), Member
 Veterans Affairs, Member

Political experience 
Bacon has had the following political experience:
 Representative, Iowa State House of Representatives, 2013–present
 Senator, Iowa State Senate, 2011–2013
 City Council member, Freemont
 City Council member, Maxwell

Professional experience 
Bacon is a licensed funeral director, and has been managing funeral homes since 1983. He is the owner of Bacon Funeral Homes.

Personal life 
Bacon's wife is Carol. They have  four children.

References

External links 
 Rob Bacon at Iowa Legislature

1955 births
American funeral directors
Living people
Republican Party members of the Iowa House of Representatives
Republican Party Iowa state senators
Politicians from Chicago
Politicians from Sioux City, Iowa
21st-century American politicians